King Arthur Park is a census-designated place (CDP) in Gallatin County, Montana, United States. The population was 738 at the 2010 census.

Demographics

References

Census-designated places in Gallatin County, Montana
Census-designated places in Montana